Frank Montague Moore (1877–1967) was a painter and the first director of the Honolulu Museum of Art.  He was born November 24, 1877 in Taunton, England, and studied at the Liverpool Art School and the Royal Institute.  He immigrated to the United States and took additional painting lessons from Henry Ward Ranger.  In 1910, he moved from New York City to Hawaii, where he worked as a purchasing agent for Hawaii Plantations.  He became the first director of the Honolulu Museum of Art in 1924, but resigned in 1927, shortly before the museum opened.  In 1928, he left Hawaii for California, where he painted 41 murals collectively known as the Picture Bridge for the Huntington Hotel in Pasadena and many easel paintings of California landscapes.  Moore died in Carmel, California on March 5, 1967.

The Auckland War Memorial Museum and the Honolulu Museum of Art are among the public collections holding paintings by Frank Montague Moore.

References
 Hughes, Edan, Artists in California 1786-1940, Sacramento, Crocker Art Museum, 2002.
 Papanikolas, Theresa and DeSoto Brown, Art Deco Hawai'i, Honolulu, Honolulu Museum of Art, 2014, p. 94
 Severson, Don R. Finding Paradise: Island Art in Private Collections, University of Hawaii Press, 2002, p. 114-5.

External links
 Smithsonian American Art Museum, Art Inventories Catalog
 Frank Moore in AskArt.com

Footnotes

1877 births
1967 deaths
Artists from Hawaii
19th-century American painters
19th-century American male artists
American male painters
20th-century American painters
Painters from California
20th-century American male artists
British emigrants to the United States